Lorena "Lori" Pierce (born October 6, 1984) is a retired American Paralympic judoka who competed at international level events. She was a silver medalist at the 2004 Summer Paralympics, a World silver medalist and a Parapan American Games silver medalist.

References

1984 births
Living people
Sportspeople from Austin, Texas
People from Arvada, Colorado
Paralympic judoka of the United States
Judoka at the 2004 Summer Paralympics
Medalists at the 2004 Summer Paralympics
American people of Cuban descent
Medalists at the 2007 Parapan American Games
American female judoka